The 2014–15 season was Irish provincial rugby union side Connacht Rugby's fourteenth season competing in the Pro12, and the team's nineteenth season as a professional side. It was also Pat Lam's second season in charge of the side.

As well as playing in the Pro12, Connacht competed in the newly established Rugby Challenge Cup, having played in the now-defunct Heineken Cup the previous season. The second-tier side, the Connacht Eagles, competed in the 2014–15 British and Irish Cup.

Season

Background
The 2014–15 season saw the Heineken Cup replaced by the 20 team Rugby Champions Cup and the creation of this competition meant the Pro12 standings would have a greater impact on European qualification. Under the previous format, the Pro12 provided a minimum of ten teams, with Scotland and Italy providing two teams each, and Ireland and Wales both providing three.

The new system saw one place now being reserved for the highest finishing Pro12 team from each of four participating countries, along with three other qualifiers based solely on league position, for a total of seven teams. The other teams were to be entered in the new second-tier competition, the Rugby Challenge Cup. This meant Connacht were no longer required to finish ahead of another Irish province or rely on an Irish victory in a European tournament to qualify for the top tier of European rugby.

The final tournament spot in the 2015–16 Rugby Champions Cup was decided by a playoff involving the Pro12's highest finishing team that is not already qualified, along with the seventh highest finishing clubs from France's Top 14 and the English Premiership.

On the player front, Connacht entered the season with a new captain following the forced retirement of Craig Clarke due to persistent concussions. They will also be without the playing services of former captain and centurion Gavin Duffy, whose contract was not renewed the previous season. It was later announced that he was taking up a role with the province's commercial team.

Due to their 10th-place finish in the 2013–14 Pro12, Connacht were entered into the 2014–15 Rugby Challenge Cup, which replaced the European Challenge Cup, a competition Connacht hadn't competed in since the 2010–11 season. The draw for the Challenge Cup pool stages took place on 10 June 2014, with Connacht named in the same group as Exeter Chiefs, Bayonne and La Rochelle.

September
Connacht opened the season with victories at home against Newport Gwent Dragons and away to Edinburgh. The team then beat provincial rivals Leinster at home, the 10–9 win giving Connacht their first inter-provincial victory since beating Leinster in the same fixture in the 2012–13 season. Connacht experienced their first defeat of the season in the next round, losing to Glasgow Warriors in their final game of the month.

October
Following their opening defeat of the season to Glasgow, Connacht opened the month of October with a draw at home to Cardiff Blues the following week, but were able to return to winning ways before the first break for European matches, beating Benetton Treviso 6–9 in Italy. Connacht opened their 2014–15 Challenge Cup campaign at the Sportsgrounds on 18 October with a 48–12 bonus point victory over Top 14 side La Rochelle. The following week, however, saw the province beaten 33–13 away to Exeter Chiefs. Connacht's first game after the European break saw them beaten 26–11 in Wales by the Ospreys on Halloween night.

November
A break in the league for the November internationals meant that Connacht didn't play a competitive match in the month until 21 November. When they returned to action, Connacht picked up a comfortable bonus point victory over Zebre at home, posting a final score of 43–3. The team followed this with a 14–8 win against 6th place rivals Scarlets at the Sportsgrounds to keep their unbeaten home record intact.

December
Connacht opened the month of December with a crucial double-header against Bayonne in the Challenge Cup, and won the first of these games comfortably, picking up a bonus point in a 42–19 victory to narrow the gap to Exeter Chiefs. Connacht named an entirely new team for the return leg, and despite being 11 points down in the second half, the team fought back to win 27–29, with academy scrum-half Caolin Blade scoring both tries.

After the two European matches, Connacht finished 2015 with two provincial derbies in a row over the Christmas period. Connacht lost the first of these matches against Leinster in Dublin. This loss was followed by a narrow away defeat to Ulster on St. Stephen's Day in the last match of the calendar year.

January
On New Year's Day, Connacht picked up where they had left off in 2014, with another league match against Irish opposition. In the final derby of this period, Connacht managed to pick up a win, beating Munster 24–16. Following this high however, Connacht were beaten at home for the first time in the season, losing 13–16 to Edinburgh. The poor form was carried into Europe as Connacht lost another home match in quick succession, being beaten 24–33 by the Exeter Chiefs. The team was able to recover the following week to beat La Rochelle and secure a place in the knock-out stage of the competition.

February
There were no games in the opening weekend of the month as the 2015 Six Nations Championship was taking place. On 15 February Connacht returned to league action, suffering a 32–14 loss away to Scarlets. The following week, Connacht were away to another Welsh side, this time facing Newport Gwent Dragons, and recovered from the previous week's disappointment to emerge 25–30 winners.

March
Connacht opened the month of March with  bonus point victory over Benetton Treviso, crushing the Italians 53–5. On 6 March, Connacht faced Cardiff Blues away ahead of a tough series of matches against teams in the play-off places, making the game important in the qualification for the 2015–16 Rugby Champions Cup. Connacht were beaten 18–17 by a late try, after the referee controversially gave a penalty against Connacht with the game in overtime after Cardiff appeared to have knocked the ball on. In the aftermath of the game, Pat Lam criticised touch judge Leighton Hodges and lodged a complaint with the league. Lam was later charged with misconduct for his comments. In spite of Lam's comments and the misconduct charge, Hodges refereed Connacht's next match, away to Munster in Thomond Park, where Connacht were beaten 42–20.

April
The team's first match in April was a Challenge Cup quarter-final against Gloucester in Kingsholm Stadium. After going in 14–0 down, Connacht held the hosts scoreless in the second half and pulled themselves back into the match with a penalty try. They couldn't make up the deficit however, and Connacht were knocked out of the Cup by 14–7.

In their return to the Pro12, Connacht suffered their second home league defeat of the season, this time to Ulster. After another poor first half performance, Connacht went in 17–0 down, only to earn a losing bonus with a final score of 20–27. Another home defeat followed, with the team shipping five tries against Glasgow Warriors in a 13–31 defeat, leaving the team in danger of finishing behind Edinburgh in 8th place and missing not only automatic qualification for the Champions Cup, but also the chance at a play-off for the final spot.

May
Connacht were able to start the month with their first win since 1 March, beating Zebre 10–40 in Italy, to earn a try bonus and leave themselves with a chance of reaching the Champions Cup. In the final round of the regular season, on 16 May, Connacht faced Ospreys, while their rivals for the Champions Cup places, Scarlets and Edinburgh, faced Benetton Treviso and Leinster respectively. Connacht picked up a losing bonus, while Scarlets won and Edinburgh were beaten by 13, leaving Connacht in 7th place, their highest finish in a regular league season, but just short of qualification to the Champions Cup.

Connacht proceeded to a play-off involving Bordeaux Bègles, the 7th placed team in the 2014–15 Top 14 season, and Gloucester the 2014–15 Rugby Challenge Cup winners. Connacht played Gloucester away on 24 May for the chance to face Bordeaux. Connacht were leading 18–25 in the final minutes of the game, but a controversial penalty decision from Romain Poite gave Gloucester a try-scoring opportunity and sent the match to extra time, after which Gloucester emerged 40–32 victors.

Coaching and Management Team

Players

Senior Playing Squad

 Senior 15's internationally capped players in bold

Academy squad

 year 1
 year 1
 year 2
 year 2
 year 2
 year 3
 year 2
 year 2
 year 1
 year 2
 year 2

 year 2
 year 1
 year 2
 year 1
 year 1
 year 2

Preseason transfers

Players in
 HK  Tom McCartney from  
 PR  Finlay Bealham promoted from academy
 LK  Quinn Roux from  Leinster (loan)
 SH  John Cooney from  Leinster (loan)
 SH  Ian Porter from  Ulster
 FH  Jack Carty promoted from academy
 CE  Bundee Aki from  Chiefs
 CE  Conor Finn promoted from academy
 CE  Shane O'Leary from  Grenoble
 WG  Niyi Adeolokun from  Dublin University
 FB  Shane Layden promoted from academy
 FB  Darragh Leader promoted from academy
 FB  Mils Muliaina from  Chiefs

Players out
 HK  James Rael to  Lansdowne
 PR  Brett Wilkinson retired
 LK  Craig Clarke retired
 LK  Dave Nolan to  Bourgoin
 FL  Aaron Conneely to  Lansdowne
 SH  Frank Murphy retired
 SH  Paul O'Donohoe retired
 FH  Dan Parks retired
 CE  Eoin Griffin to  London Irish
 CE  Brian Murphy to  Galwegians
 CE  Kyle Tonetti retired
 FB  Gavin Duffy to  Mayo Football

Playing kit
Connacht's official kit supplier for the season was Australian manufacturer BLK sport, who announced a comprehensive four-year agreement to supply the full range of apparel for all of Connacht Rugby's representative teams and support staff in 2013.

Connacht's main shirt sponsors were Irish sporting retailer Lifestyle Sports. Lifestyle Sports signed a four-season deal with the province, to will see their logo feature on the jersey until the end of the 2017–18 season, taking over from the previous season's sponsors Mazda Ireland.

Results

Pro12

Rugby Challenge Cup

Pool 2

Quarter-finals

Champions Cup play-offs

Match 1

Awards and recognition
At the end of the 2014–15 Pro12 season, an Awards evening was held in the Guinness Storehouse in Dublin, with Connacht among those honoured both as a team and for individual performance.

Connacht held their own awards ceremony in May, to acknowledge the services of individual players.

Connacht also had awards throughout the season for the Player of the Month, as voted by the team's supporters.

Notes

References

2014-15
2014–15 Pro12 by team
2014–15 in Irish rugby union